White Nights is a British radio documentary series, broadcast on BBC Radio 4 between 31 July and 4 August 2006.

The show is described as a "series of reflections on what happens on a summer night between wakefulness and sleep."

On each show, a famous person describes what happens to them during a summer night. Also, the show includes poetry, music and discussions on religious and other matters. People appearing include:

 Tamsin Greig, actress, star of Green Wing.
 Bobby Friction, disc jockey and critic.
 Lavinia Greenlaw, poet.
 Simon Elmes, radio producer.
 David Blunkett, former Labour home secretary.

References

External links
 BBC Radio 4 White Nights website.

BBC Radio 4 programmes